This list comprises notable Saraswat Brahmins, by profession.

Politics
 Motilal Nehru, lawyer
 Jawaharlal Nehru, former Prime Minister
 Indira Gandhi, former Prime Minister
 Arun Jaitley, former Finance Minister
 Beena Kak, Minister, Rajasthan
 Manohar Parrikar, former Chief Minister of Goa
 P. N. Haksar, bureaucrat and diplomat
 Sunil Dutt, former Ministry of Youth Affairs and Sports.
 Tej Bahadur Sapru, Lawyer

Military
Tapishwar Narain Raina, 9th Chief of the Army Staff of Indian Army

Police force
Sanjiv Bhatt, Indian Police Service officer of the Gujarat-cadre

Cinema
 Aditya Dhar, film director, screenwriter and lyricist
 Ajay Devgn, actor.
 Guru Dutt, film director
 M. K. Raina, actor
 Mani Kaul, film director 
 Anupam Kher, actor 
 Kunal Khemu, actor
 Mohit Raina, Actor
 Manav Kaul, actor
 Deepika Padukone, Indian actress
 Pallavi Sharda, actress
 Sanjay Dutt, actor.
 Sunil Dutt, actor and politician.
 P.L.Deshpande, Indian Marathi writer.
 Dilip Prabhavalkar, Indian actor.
 Ashok Saraf, Indian actor.

Sports
 Anil Kaul, Canadian badminton player.
 Bapu Nadkarni, Indian cricketer.
 Sachin Tendulkar, Indian cricketer.
 Dilip Vengsarkar, Indian cricketer.
 Sunil Gavaskar, Indian cricketer.
 Sanjay Manjrekar Indian cricketer.
 Dalima Chhibber, women's cricketer.
 Prakash Padukone, badminton player.
 Suresh Raina, cricketer.

Entertainment and Music
 Samay Raina, stand-up comedian and YouTuber
Kapil Sharma, stand up comedian, Television personality and actor.
 Sanjay Dutt, Indian actor.
 KRSNA (rapper), Indian Rapper from Kashmir Valley.

References

Kashmiri Brahmins

Saraswat Brahmin